Greenacre, Greenacres, Green Acre or Green Acres School may refer to:

Australia
Greenacre Public School, a primary school in Greenacre, New South Wales, Australia

Canada
Green Acres Elementary School, an elementary school in Hamilton, Ontario, Canada

New Zealand
Greenacres School, a primary school in Greenacres, Tawa, Wellington, New Zealand

United Kingdom
Greenacre School for Girls, a girls' independent school in Banstead, Surrey, England
Greenacre Academy, formerly Greenacre School, a boys' secondary academy in Walderslake, Kent, England
Greenacres Primary School, a primary school in Greenacres, Greater Manchester
Greenacre School, Barnsley, an academy in Barnsley, United Kingdom

United States
Green Acres School, an elementary and middle school in North Bethesda, Maryland, United States